Sweet crude oil is a type of petroleum. The New York Mercantile Exchange designates petroleum with less than 0.5% sulfur as sweet.

Petroleum containing higher levels of sulfur is called sour crude oil.

Sweet crude oil contains small amounts of hydrogen sulfide and carbon dioxide. High-quality, low-sulfur crude oil is commonly used for processing into gasoline and is in high demand, particularly in industrialized nations. Light sweet crude oil is the most sought-after version of crude oil as it contains a disproportionately large fraction that is directly processed (fractionation) into gasoline (naphtha), kerosene, and high-quality diesel (gas oil). 

The term sweet originates from the fact that a low level of sulfur provides the oil with a relatively sweet taste and pleasant smell, compared to sulfurous oil. Nineteenth-century prospectors would taste and smell small quantities of oil to determine its quality.

Producers 

Producers of sweet crude oil include:

 Asia/Pacific:
 The Far East/Oceania:
 Australia
 Brunei
 China
 India
 Indonesia
 Malaysia
 New Zealand
 Vietnam
 The Middle East
 Iraq
 Saudi Arabia
 United Arab Emirates
 North America:
 Canada
 United States of America
 Europe:
Russia
Azerbaijan
 The North Sea area: 
Norway
United Kingdom (Brent Crude)
England
Scotland
 Africa:
 North Africa:
 Algeria
 Libya
 Western Africa
 Nigeria
 Ghana
 Central Africa
 Angola
 Democratic Republic of the Congo
 Republic of the Congo
 South Sudan
 South America:
 The Guianas:
 Suriname, Guyana Basin
 Andean Region 
 Colombia 
 Peru 
 Southern Cone 
 Argentina 
 Brazil

Pricing

The term "price of oil", as used in the U.S. media, generally means the cost per barrel (42 U.S. gallons) of West Texas Intermediate Crude, to be delivered to Cushing, Oklahoma during the upcoming month. This information is available from NYMEX or the U.S. Energy Information Administration.

See also
 Petroleum Classification
 Light crude oil
 Sour crude oil
 Mazut
 List of crude oil products
 Oil price increases since 2003

References

External links
  EIA oil prices
  NYMEX website

Petroleum